Fairway Island may refer to:

Places
 Fairway Island, Nunavut - an uninhabited island in Hudson Bay, now known as Pitsiulartok
 Fairway Island, Chile - island in the Strait of Magellan and site of the Aug. 3, 1940 disaster of the Chilean passenger ferry Moraleda, in which 67 passengers lost their lives.
 Fairway Island, Alaska - a small island in the eastern part of Peril Strait
 Fairway Island, Alaska - a small island located in Sumner Strait
 Fairway Island, a small islet off Bagga Island, in the Solomon Islands

Other uses
 Fairway Island, an 1892 novel by Horace Gordon Hutchinson